The 2007 Formula 3 Euro Series season was the fifth championship year of Europe’s premier Formula Three series. As in previous years, the championships took place over ten rounds – each with two races – held at a variety of European circuits. Each weekend consisted of one 60-minute practice session and one qualifying session, followed by one c.110 km race and one c.80 km race. The single qualifying session was retained from 2006, with the starting order for race 2 being determined by the finishing order of race 1, with the top eight positions reversed. This season was notable for the return of Volkswagen as an F3 engine supplier. The drivers' title was won by Romain Grosjean and the teams' title was again won by ASM Formule 3. It was the fourth double title win in succession for ASM. The top four drivers in the championship would go on to race in Formula 1: Sébastien Buemi, Kamui Kobayashi and champion Grosjean all debuted in F1 in 2009 and Nico Hülkenberg in 2010.

Teams and drivers

Driver changes
 Changed Teams
 Yelmer Buurman: Fortec Motorsport → Manor Motorsport
 Romain Grosjean: Signature-Plus → ASM Formule 3
 Esteban Guerrieri: Manor Motorsport → Ultimate Motorsport
 James Jakes: Hitech Racing → Manor Motorsport
 Filip Salaquarda: Team I.S.R. → Jo Zeller Racing
 Tim Sandtler: Signature-Plus → Jo Zeller Racing
 Jonathan Summerton: ASL Mücke Motorsport → R.C. Motorsport

 Entering/Re-Entering Formula 3 Euro Series
 Sergey Afanasyev: Formula Renault 2.0 NEC & Formula Renault 2.0 Switzerland (Lukoil Racing) → HBR Motorsport
 Cyndie Allemann: German Formula Three Championship (SMS Seyffarth Motorsport) → Manor Motorsport
 Yann Clairay: Eurocup Formula Renault 2.0 (SG Formula) → Signature-Plus
 Dani Clos: Italian Formula Renault Championship (Pons Racing) & Eurocup Formula Renault 2.0 (Facondini Racing) → Signature-Plus
 Carlo van Dam: French Formula Renault Championship & Eurocup Formula Renault 2.0 (SG Formula) → RC Motorsport
 Michael Devaney: Porsche Carrera Cup Great Britain (Porsche Motorsport) → Ultimate Motorsport
 Tom Dillmann: French Formula Renault Championship & Eurocup Formula Renault 2.0 (SG Formula) → ASM Formule 3
 Maximilian Götz: Sabbatical →  RC Motorsport
 Euan Hankey: Formula BMW UK (Fortec Motorsport) → HS Technik Motorsport
 Marco Holzer: Formula BMW ADAC (AM-Holzer Rennsport) → AM-Holzer Rennsport
 Nico Hülkenberg: German Formula Three Championship (Josef Kaufmann Racing) → ASM Formule 3
 Franck Mailleux: British Formula Renault Championship (Manor Motorsport) → Manor Motorsport
 Edoardo Mortara: Italian Formula Renault Championship & Eurocup Formula Renault 2.0 (Prema Powerteam) → Signature-Plus
 Michael Patrizi: Formula BMW UK (Motaworld Racing) → Prema Powerteam
 Edoardo Piscopo: Italian Formula Renault Championship & Eurocup Formula Renault 2.0 (Cram Competition) → ASL Mücke Motorsport
 Basil Shaaban: British Formula 3 National Class (Comtec F3) → HBR Motorsport
 Harald Schlegelmilch: German Formula Three Championship (HS Technik Motorsport) → HS Technik Motorsport
 Jean-Karl Vernay: French Formula Renault Championship & Eurocup Formula Renault 2.0 (SG Formula) → Signature-Plus
 Renger van der Zande: German Formula Three Championship (SMS Seyffarth Motorsport) → Prema Powerteam

 Leaving Formula 3 Euro Series
 Richard Antinucci: HBR Motorsport → Indy Lights (Cheever Racing)
 Récardo Bruins Choi: Van Amersfoort Racing → German Formula Three Championship (Van Amersfoort Racing)
 Peter Elkmann: Jo Zeller Racing → Sabbatical
 Natacha Gachnang: Bordoli Motorsport & Jo Zeller Racing → Star Mazda Championship (AIM Autosport)
 Giedo van der Garde: ASM Formule 3 → Formula Renault 3.5 Series (Victory Engineering)
 Kohei Hirate: Manor Motorsport → GP2 Series (Trident Racing)
 Charlie Kimball: Signature-Plus → Formula Renault 3.5 Series (Victory Engineering)
 Julia Kuhn: Kuhn Motorsport → BFGoodrich Endurance Championship
 Ronayne O'Mahony: Prema Powerteam → FIA GT3 European Championship (Trackspeed Racing)
 Guillaume Moreau: Signature-Plus  → Formula Renault 3.5 Series (KTR)
 Dominick Muermans: Van Amersfoort Racing → International Formula Master (Ombra Racing)
 Kazuki Nakajima: Manor Motorsport → GP2 Series (DAMS)
 Paolo Maria Nocera: Prema Powerteam → Italian Formula Three Championship (Lucidi Motors)
 Alejandro Núñez: Prema Powerteam  → Formula Renault 3.5 Series (Red Devil Team Comtec)
 Paul di Resta: ASM Formule 3 → Deutsche Tourenwagen Masters (Persson Motorsport)
 Roberto Streit: Prema Powerteam → All-Japan Formula Three Championship (Inging Motorsport)
 João Urbano: Prema Powerteam → A1 Grand Prix (A1 Team Portugal)
 Sebastian Vettel: ASM Formule 3 → Formula Renault 3.5 Series (Carlin Motorsport)
 James Walker: Hitech Racing → Formula Renault 3.5 Series (Fortec Motorsport)

 Leaving Trophy Class
 Julien Abelli: Janiec Racing Team → V de V Challenge Endurance Moderne — Proto
 Gina-Maria Adenauer: SMS Seyffarth Motorsport → Retirement
 Cemil Çipa: HBR Motorsport → Retirement
 Kevin Fank: SMS Seyffarth Motorsport → German Formula Three Championship (JMS Jenichen Motorsport)
 Bruno Fechner: SMS Seyffarth Motorsport → Sabbatical
 Anthony Janiec: Janiec Racing Team → Retirement
 Dominik Schraml: SMS Seyffarth Motorsport → International Formula Master (ADM Motorsport)
 Julian Theobald: SMS Seyffarth Motorsport  → Formula Renault 3.5 Series (EuroInternational)

Additional participations
HS Technik expanded to a two-car entry from round 5 (Mugello) onwards. The second car was taken by Euan Hankey, making his Formula Three début. At the Nürburgring, Am-Holzer Rennsport replaced its Speiss-Opel engine with the new Volkswagen and RC Motorsport made a return to the championship with two Volkswagen-powered cars for Maximilian Götz and Jonathan Summerton. Though Götz finished in sixth place in the first race, neither he nor Summerton were eligible to score points. British F3 team Ultimate Motorsport made a one-off appearance in round 4 at Magny-Cours. Bas Leinders's Junior Team entered a single car for Michael Herck in the first round, but has not competed since then.

Calendar

Season standings

Drivers Standings
Points are awarded as follows:

† — Drivers did not finish the race, but were classified as they completed over 90% of the race distance.

Rookie Cup
Rookie drivers are only eligible for the Rookie Cup title if they have not previously competed in a national or international Formula 3 championship.

Team Standings

Nations Cup

Notes

References

External links
F3euroseries.com
Formel3guide.com (German language)
Speedsport

Formula 3 Euro Series seasons
Euro Series
Formula 3 Euro Series